Quiana and Quianna is a given name. Notable people with the name include:

Quiana Grant (born 1982), American model 
Quiana Lynell (born 1981), American blues and jazz singer, arranger, and songwriter
Quianna Chaney (born 1986), American basketball player